Ancylomenes venustus, also known as the graceful anemone shrimp, is a species of shrimp which belongs to the family of the Palaemonidae. This species is found in the tropical waters from the centre of the Indo-Pacific biogeographical area. A. venustus lives in association with scleractinians and actiniarians (sea anemones) and is a cleaner shrimp.

References

External links

Palaemonoidea
Crustaceans described in 1989